Edward Quist (born Edward Paul Quist in Brooklyn, December 9, 1976) is an American director, screenwriter, producer, composer, multidiscipline artist who also works under the name Embryoroom.
Themes emerging from Quist's work include electronic and biomorphic imagery, experimental narrative, the unorthodox use of motion graphics and visuals.

Embryoroom
Embryoroom has been in operation since the mid 1990s, originating as a production identity and shortly thereafter as an identity Edward Quist performed multimedia exhibitions and released a number of projects under. Embryoroom evolved into a concept and studio for ideas uneasily classifiable, and a different exploration outside of the orthodoxy in art and media. Embryoroom has released a number of films and recordings on digital platforms.

Filmography

The Black Vertebrate
Artist and filmmaker, Edward Paul Quist, aka Embryoroom, returns with a relentless assault on the senses. Sinister, pulsating, and primal The Black Vertebrate, a short or long form film depending on which version is experienced, has been described as a next level masterpiece of experimental film, environment, and sound. Split into nine chapters, The Black Vertebrate holds up a disturbing reflection to the complex world we have created. Embryroom pushes the limits of his unique and unmistakable style. It's as if one is trapped inside an artificial intelligence that is breaking down into some unknown realm of psychosis.

HAZMASK Anthology
Embryoroom produced, directed, and scored “intersodes” (web series), aka HAZMASK, consisting of The Third Rail and Chamber of Aversion. They are akin to abstract moving paintings informed by the theme of “abduction phenomena”.  Intersodes were released on amazon.com and iTunes. 
Hazmazk premiered at The Museu d'art Contemporani de Barcelona during the Sónar Festival.

Intersodes

The Third Rail

Synopsis
ABDUCTION! Shackled by Light Rays on a Death Train, Viz, speeding toward an unknown destination, phases in and out of consciousness as Blood Flowers infect his mind. Memory is manipulated and his identity scanned by an ominous presence. Viz is identified and as a target for extermination by the mysterious Forces of Hate. . .

Chamber of Aversion

Synopsis
INTERROGATION! VIZ nearly perishing from disintegration, is reintegrated and transferred to the mysterious camp thunderbolt. time has passed, though how music is unknown. He is examined physically and electronically. his strange inquisitors present their hybrid experiment
and attempt to avert VIZ's mind.

Kuvaputki / Cathode Ray Tube / Set
Kuvaputki is the best selling multi angle DVD by Embryoroom produced and directed by Edward Quist and co-produced by Derek Gruen aka Del Marquis. with music by Pan Sonic, the award-winning Finnish experimental electronic music duo consisting of Mika Vainio and Ilpo Väisänen.

Gallery Screenings
Ikon Eastside gallery
Kunsthalle Wien project space

Lifebomb gallery Berlin
Envoy gallery

Festival Screenings
Sonar Festival 
Avanto, Festival
Buenos Aires International Independent Film Festival 
Dissonanze festival 
Tampere Film Festival 
The Milan Film Festival 

The Museu d'art Contemporani de Barcelona

Other Films 
1993 - Hands
1994 - I.L.
1996 - Clean Needle
1998 - Surgery
1999 - Kuvaputki
2000 - Backroom
2001 - Suicide
2002 - Macca
2003 - SICMAN
2007 - The Cathodites

References

External links

http://edwardquist.com
http://embryoroom.com

1976 births
Living people
American composers
American film directors
American film producers
American screenwriters
American multimedia artists